Linda Kay "Lynn" Lowry (born October 15, 1947) is an American actress, screenwriter and producer.

She is perhaps best known for her work in horror films, having appeared in the cult films I Drink Your Blood (1970), George A. Romero's The Crazies (1973) and David Cronenberg's Shivers (1975).

Early life
Lowry was born in East St. Louis, Illinois, and lived in Cahokia, Illinois during her early childhood. At age twelve, she relocated with her family to Burbank, California, and later, Atlanta, Georgia, where her father transferred for work.

She enrolled at the University of Georgia on a scholarship in 1966, studying theater for two years. She later worked as a Playboy Bunny at the Atlanta Playboy Club, and gave birth to her son. In 1969, Lowry moved with her son to New York City, working as a bartender while auditioning for acting roles.

Career
While auditioning for a role in Joe (1970) in New York City, Lowry met Lloyd Kaufman, who asked her to appear in a supporting part in The Battle of Love's Return (1971), which she accepted. After completing the film in early 1970, she was cast in David Durston's horror film I Drink Your Blood (1970).

She appeared in two key 1970s horror films, George A. Romero's The Crazies (1973) and David Cronenberg's Shivers (1974), followed by a sixteen-month role as the adulterer-heroine Sandra on NBC's short-lived soap opera How to Survive a Marriage, as well as a brief part on the daytime serial Another World. She also appeared opposite Peter Fonda in Jonathan Demme's vigilante thriller Fighting Mad (1976).

Lowry was also one of the two female leads in Radley Metzger's film Score (1974). She and Carl Parker are the only actors from the film who are still alive as of 2007.

Lowry moved to Los Angeles in the early 1980s, but ended up abandoning her acting career after appearing in Cat People (1982). "I was in Hollywood and I just got tired of the bullshit," she said. "I wasn’t doing horror movies when I was in Hollywood, I was just going out for TV and other auditions and I got tired so I gave it up; I focused on doing theatre and even sang in a band."

Her later films include Splatter Disco, Basement Jack and Schism, which she co-wrote and co-produced. Lowry also starred in Dante Tomaselli's Torture Chamber. She can be seen in the twenty-fourth minute of the film. In 2015, she co-starred with Debbie Rochon in the horror film The House of Covered Mirrors. In 2010, Lowry had a cameo appearance in the 2010 remake of The Crazies. In 2022, Lowry starred as Gina Cochran in Richard Burgin's Fang.

Filmography

Films

References

External links
 
 
 Official MySpace

1947 births
Living people
American film actresses
American television actresses
American women film producers
American women screenwriters
People from East St. Louis, Illinois
People from Cahokia, Illinois
Film producers from Illinois
Screenwriters from Illinois
21st-century American women